Wuhan Gymnasium is an indoor sporting arena in Wuhan, China.  The capacity of the arena is 13,000 spectators.  It hosts indoor sporting events such as basketball and volleyball.  It was the main venue for the 2011 FIBA Asia Championship. It is also venue for the 2014 FIBA Asia Cup.  It is located near Wuhan Sports Center Stadium.  It was also the site for the Play-In and Group Stage for the 2017 League of Legends Worlds.

References

Indoor arenas in China
Basketball venues in China
Sports venues in Wuhan
Esports venues in China